Stryiskyi Park (Kilinski Park) is one of the oldest and most beautiful Parks in Lviv, a monument of landscape art of national importance. Located in Sofiyivka, Halytskyi district. It was considered the most beautiful park in interwar Poland.

History 
The outskirts of Lviv in ancient times consisted of sandy ravines, steep ravines and valleys. The arrangement of the park began in 1879 on the initiative of city councilor Stanislav Nemchynovsky. Stryiskiy Park was designed by the famous master of landscape art Arnold Rering, an engineer of urban plantations, in 1876–1877 on the territory of the former so-called "first" Stryiskiy Cemetery, which was closed in 1823. A total of 40,000 trees were planted: spruce, maple, sycamore, exotic species such as red oak, tulip tree, red beech, ginkgo. In 1887, the Lviv City Council considered the construction of a monument to Jan Kilinski, one of the participants in the uprising led by Tadeusz Kosciuszko. The construction site was a newly created park, which was named Kilinski Park. As early as 1888, work began on the construction of a monument commissioned by the famous Ukrainian sculptor Hryhoriy Kuznevych and Yulian Markovsky. For this purpose the stone block was delivered from Mykolayiv. The monument was unveiled on 18 June 1895, where it still stands. However, the name "Kilinski Park" did not take root, and the name "Stryiskiy Park" proved to be more popular and has stood the test of time.

Initially, the park was only its lower part. The top was a wasteland. On it, in 1894, the National Exhibition was held, for which numerous exhibition pavilions were built. Prior to this event, an electric tram was opened in Lviv, and a tram track was brought to the territory.

During World War I, an Austrian pilot was killed in Stryiskiy Park, and his grave was established near the Palace of Arts. In November 1918, there were graves of Ukrainian riflemen, who were exhumed and reburied in the cemetery.

From 1922 until the beginning of the World War II, the park hosted the exhibition-fair "Targi Wschodnie", for which local government brought narrow-gauge railways for the delivery of goods and passengers from the station Persenkivka. Stanislav Lem often mentions this annual exhibition. In the 1930s, a radio tower was built here.

In the 1920s, one of Lviv's guides wrote:

In 1951, the narrow-gauge tracks used to service the Targi Wschodnie were partially dismantled and partially used to create the Lviv Children's Railway.

In 1952, the main entrance to the park was decorated with a light arch of the Corinthian order designed by Soviet architect Heinrich Shvetsky-Vinetsky. During the Soviet period, the park area was enlarged due to wastelands and unused areas, a cast-iron fence was installed, and new species of trees and shrubs were planted.

In 2008, the first skatepark in Ukraine was opened in the upper part of Stryiskiy Park. In 2009, a monument to Jan Kilinski was restored with funds provided by the Government of the Republic of Poland. Reconstruction of the park has been going on since 2009, in particular, external lighting is being restored, paths are being bridged.

In June 2011, the restoration of the "Ivasyk-Telesyk" fountain was completed. UAH 2.4 million has been allocated from the city budget for these needs. However, within a month the bowl of the fountain cracked. In the summer of 2013 it was restored after the reconstruction of the fountain.

Current state 
The park covers more than 52 hectares. It is located in the Halytskyi district of Lviv, between Ivana Franka, Stryiska, Ulas Samchuk and Kozelnytska streets. It consists of three landscape parts:

 the zone of the lower parterres – on the bottom of the beam
 forest park zone – on the slopes of the beam
 the upper terrace, which is actually the territory of the former exhibition "Targi Wschodnie". 
The basis of the park territory planning is a deep erosion valley, through which the Soroka stream flowed (left tributary of the Poltva); now there is a footpath that connects the upper terrace with the lower part of the park.

There are more than 200 species of trees and plants in the Stryiskiy Park, there is a greenhouse, a rock garden, a sycamore and a lime alley. There is growing red oak, tulip tree, magnolia, Weymouth pine, Japanese lilac, Manchurian aralia, ginkgo biloba.

Not far from the main gate there is a pond with swans. The park also has sports buildings of Lviv Polytechnic (located in the buildings of the former Palace of Arts and Ratslavytska Panorama), the main building of the Ukrainian Academy of Design, cinema "Lviv", three restaurants, Lviv Chamber of Commerce, library No. 18.

Gallery

References

Lviv